Carlos Jaime Hoffmann Vargas (5 May 1936 – 4 June 2013) was a Chilean footballer. He played in ten matches for the Chile national football team from 1959 to 1965, eight of which were A-class matches. He was also part of Chile's squad for the 1959 South American Championship that took place in Argentina.

Personal life
His younger brother, was also a Chile international footballer. In addition, his nephews, Reinaldo and Alejandro, both sons of Reynaldo, were professional footballers. From his niece Lorena, who married the Chilean former international footballer Raúl González, he was the great uncle of her sons Mark González, a former Chile international footballer, and Raúl Hoffmann, an actor and football agent.

Honours
Santiago Wanderers
 Chilean Primera División (1): 1958
 Copa Chile (2): 1959, 1961

References

External links
 
 Carlos Hoffmann at MemoriaWanderers 
 Carlos Hoffmann at PartidosdeLaRoja 

1936 births
2013 deaths
Sportspeople from Valparaíso
Chilean footballers
Chile international footballers
Association football midfielders
Santiago Wanderers footballers
Deportes Temuco footballers
Deportes Concepción (Chile) footballers
Naval de Talcahuano footballers
Club de Deportes Green Cross footballers
Chilean Primera División players
Primera B de Chile players
Chilean football managers
Deportes Concepción (Chile) managers
Chilean Primera División managers